Dan Saddler (born 1961 in Elyria, Ohio) is an American politician who has served as a Republican member of the Alaska House of Representatives since January 18, 2013. He represents District 12. Saddler consecutively served from 2011 until 2013 while it was the District 18 seat.

Career
Saddler's professional experiences include being an engineering magazine editor, newspaper reporter, legislative staffer for various lawmakers in Alaska, and a public relations executive for an Alaska regional corporation.

Education
Saddler earned his BA in journalism from Miami University and his MA from Ohio State University.

Elections
2012 With Republican Representative Eric Feige redistricted to District 6, Saddler won the District 12 August 28, 2012 Republican Primary with 1,185 votes (88.30%), and was unopposed for the November 6, 2012 General election, winning with 4,663 votes (96.56%) against write-in candidates.
2010 When Republican Representative Nancy Dahlstrom resigned and the District 18 seat was left open through the election, Saddler won the three-way August 24, 2010 Republican Primary by 4 votes, with 415 votes (35.84%), and won the November 2, 2010 General election with 1,944 votes (68.89%) against Democratic nominee Martin Lindeke.

Personal life 
Saddler and his wife Chris and have two children together, Peggy and Danny.

Saddler's interests include family, hiking, flying, writing songs and performing, and American history.

References

External links
 Official page at the Alaska Legislature
 Campaign site
 
 Dan Saddler at 100 Years of Alaska's Legislature

1961 births
21st-century American politicians
Date of birth missing (living people)
Living people
Miami University alumni
Ohio State University alumni
People from Elyria, Ohio
Politicians from Anchorage, Alaska
Republican Party members of the Alaska House of Representatives